R.S.C. Anderlecht won the title of the 1993–94 season.

Relegated teams

These teams were relegated to the second division at the end of the season:
K.S.V. Waregem
K.R.C. Genk

Final league table

Results

Top goal scorers

References

Belgian Pro League seasons
Belgian
1993–94 in Belgian football